The Asia/Oceania Zone is one of the three zones of regional Davis Cup competition in 2011.

In the Asia/Oceania Zone there are four different groups in which teams compete against each other to advance to the next group.

Participating teams

Format
The eight teams were split into two groups and played round-robin. The top two teams advanced to the promotion pool where the two top teams will be promoted to the Asia/Oceania Zone Group II for 2012. The last two placed teams from the preliminary round were relegated into the relegation pool and the two bottom teams will be relegated to the Asia/Oceania Zone Group IV for 2012.

It was played on clay on 15–18 June 2011 and the venue was the Sri Lanka Tennis Association, Colombo, Sri Lanka and it was played on outdoor hard.

Group stage

Group A

Kuwait vs. Myanmar

Sri Lanka vs. Vietnam

Kuwait vs. Vietnam

Sri Lanka vs. Myanmar

Sri Lanka vs. Kuwait

Vietnam vs. Myanmar

Group B

Malaysia vs. United Arab Emirates

Oman vs. Lebanon

Malaysia vs. Oman

Lebanon vs. United Arab Emirates

Malaysia vs. Lebanon

Oman vs. United Arab Emirates

Promotion pool
Results and points from games against the opponent from the preliminary round were carried forward.

Sri Lanka vs. Malaysia

Vietnam vs. Lebanon

Sri Lanka vs. Lebanon

Vietnam vs. Malaysia

Relegation pool
Results and points from games against the opponent from the preliminary round were carried forward.

Kuwait vs. United Arab Emirates

Myanmar vs. Oman

Kuwait vs. Oman

Myanmar vs. United Arab Emirates

References

External links
Davis Cup draw details

Asia Oceania Zone Group III
Davis Cup Asia/Oceania Zone